Sulc or SULC may refer to:
 Šulc, a Czech surname
 Southern University Law Center, a campus of the Southern University System
 Sydney University Liberal Club, an Australian students' political club